John Charles Moore de Bienville Grant, 9th Baron de Longueuil was born in 1861 at Bath, Somerset. He was the son of Charles James Irwin Grant and Anne Marie Catherine Trapman. He succeeded to the title of Baron de Longueuil on 3 August 1931. He died on 17 October 1935 at Pau, France.

Ancestry

References

recognized by the Crown in right of Canada

People from Bath, Somerset

1861 births
1935 deaths
Barons of Longueuil
Le Moyne family